William McLane (1819–1906) was an Olympia, Washington pioneer and member of the Washington Territorial Legislature. He was from Butler County, Pennsylvania. He and Martha McLeod McLane pioneered a  homestead on Mud Bay. Place names such as McLane Creek are named for him, as is McLane Elementary School in the Olympia School District, on a hill above and east of Mud Bay, and the McLane Grange in Delphi Valley, to whom he donated land.

McLane originally left Pennsylvania in 1852 and made his way to Washington Territory by ox-drawn wagon. He returned east to marry in 1854 then returned to Washington by sea via the Isthmus of Panama. Once there, he homesteaded at Bush Prairie (founded by pioneer George Washington Bush, now in Tumwater), and later moved to the Mud Bay homestead.

McLane died in Thurston County in 1906 after living in his home for over 50 years.

Legislative terms
Source: Washington State Legislature
Ninth session (1861) House — Thurston County
Eleventh session (1863) House — Thurston County
Thirteenth session (1865) House — Mason and Chehalis County
First biennial session (1867) Council — Thurston and Lewis County
Second biennial session (1869) Council — Thurston and Lewis County
Fourth biennial session (1873) Council — Thurston and Lewis County

References

Books

Further reading
William McLane Collection, 1819-1906 indexed at Orbis Cascade Alliance, held at The Evergreen State College Library

Members of the Washington Territorial Legislature
19th-century American politicians
People from Olympia, Washington
People from Butler County, Pennsylvania
1819 births
1906 deaths
Washington (state) pioneers
People from Tumwater, Washington